The Hong Kong national handball team is the national team of Hong Kong. It is governed by the Handball Association of Hong Kong and takes part in international handball competitions.

Asian Championship record
1983 – 8th place
1989 – 9th place
2020 – 10th place
2022 – 11th place

References

External links

IHF profile

Men's national handball teams
National sports teams of Hong Kong